Richard Laurel (born July 11, 1954) is an American former professional basketball player. He played college basketball at Hofstra University and played one season for the Milwaukee Bucks of the National Basketball Association (NBA).

A 6'6" guard born in Philadelphia, Laurel played college basketball at Hofstra University. He played one season (1977–78) in the National Basketball Association as a member of the Milwaukee Bucks. Laurel scored 24 points in ten games. The following season he signed with the New Jersey Nets but was waived before the start of the season. He later played in Italy (Hurlingham Trieste), France and Belgium.

References

1954 births
Living people
American expatriate basketball people in Belgium
American expatriate basketball people in France
American expatriate basketball people in Italy
American expatriate basketball people in Monaco
American men's basketball players
AS Monaco Basket players
Basketball players from Philadelphia
Hofstra Pride men's basketball players
Milwaukee Bucks players
Pallacanestro Trieste players
Portland Trail Blazers draft picks
Shooting guards